
Q'ara Quta (Aymara q'ara bare, bald, quta lake, "bare lake", Hispanicized spellings Khara Kkota) is a Bolivian lake near hamlet Caracota  in the Potosí Department, Chayanta Province, Pocoata Municipality.

References 

Lakes of Potosí Department